Amargadhi is a municipality and the district headquarter of Dadeldhura District in Sudurpashchim Province of western Nepal. It was named after Gorkha General Amar Singh Thapa, who fought in the Gurkha War between 1814 and 1816 At the time of the 2011 Nepal census it had a population of 21,245 people living in 4,778 individual households.

Transportation  
Mahakali Highway links Amargadhi to the Terai region of Nepal as well as Api Municipality in the Lesser Himalayas. Seti Highway branches off Mahakali Highway at Amargadhi towards Dipayal Silgadhi.

Media 
To Promote local culture Amargadhi has three community radio stations, Radio Amargadhi 97.4 MHz, Radio Sudur Awaz 95 MHz, and Radio Aafno 104.8 MHz.

Climate

Twin towns – sister cities 

 Kathmandu

References

External links
UN map of the municipalities of  Dadeldhura District

Populated places in Dadeldhura District
Nepal municipalities established in 1997
Municipalities in Dadeldhura District